Push–pull perfusion is an in vivo sampling method most commonly used for measuring neurotransmitters in the brain. Developed by J.H. Gaddum in 1960, 
this technique replaced the cortical cup technique for observing neurotransmitters. The advent of concentric microdialysis probes in the 1980s resulted in push-pull sampling falling out of favor, as such probes require less monitoring, and are less invasive than the higher flow rate push-pull probes (>10 microliter/min), which could result in lesions if flow is unbalanced.

With the advent of microfluidics and miniaturized probes, low-flow push–pull sampling was developed in 2002. By using flow rates of ~50 nL/min, this technique minimizes tissue damage while providing finer spatial resolution than microdialysis sampling.

References

External links 
 International Society for Monitoring Molecules in Neuroscience

Biochemistry methods
Diagnostic neurology
Neurochemistry
Neurotechnology